Trombone Four-in-Hand is an album by trombonist Dicky Wells which was recorded in 1959 and released on the Felsted label.

Reception

Ken Dryden of AllMusic states: "Dicky Wells is one of the most important swing trombonists, though he is better known for his work as a sideman than as a leader. But when he got the occasional opportunity to lead a record date, which was all too infrequent, he made the most of it. ... Spirited solos and tight horn ensembles are common features throughout most of the session".

Track listing
All compositions by Dicky Wells except where noted.
 "Blue Moon" (Richard Rodgers, Lorenz Hart) – 3:38
 "Airlift" (Skip Hall) – 6:41
 "It's All Over Now" (Harry White) – 4:02
 "Wine-O Junction" – 5:38
 "Heavy Duty" – 6:40
 "Short, Tall, Fat and Small" – 6:31
 "Girl Hunt" – 6:35

Personnel
Dicky Wells – trombone
Vic Dickenson, George Matthews, Benny Morton – trombone
Skip Hall – piano, organ
Everett Barksdale – guitar, electric bass
Kenny Burrell – guitar (tracks 1-4)
Major Holley – bass (tracks 5-7)
Herbie Lovelle – drums

References

Dicky Wells albums
1959 albums
Felsted Records albums